Asenray is a village in the Dutch province of Limburg. It is a part of the municipality of Roermond, and lies about 3 km east of Roermond.

It was first mentioned in 1267 as "vicum qui dicitur Asenraede", and means "forest cultivation by Aso (person)". Asenray was home to 194 people in 1840. A church was built in 1932. In 1945, just before liberation, it was blown up by the Germans. In 1948, a new church was built.

References

Populated places in Limburg (Netherlands)
Roermond